Antiphrastis is a genus of moths belonging to the subfamily Tortricinae of the family Tortricidae.

Species
Antiphrastis galenopa Meyrick, in de Joannis, 1930

See also
List of Tortricidae genera

References

 , 2005: World Catalogue of Insects volume 5 Tortricidae.
 , 1930, in de Joannis Annales de la Société Entomologique de France 98(Suppl)(1929): 713.

External links
Tortricidae.com

Archipini
Monotypic moth genera
Tortricidae genera
Taxa named by Edward Meyrick